Missouri is the debut album by American rock band Missouri released in August 1977 on Panama Records, catalog PRS-1022.  The album was produced by Ron West and Chris Fritz.  "Movin' On" received the most airplay, with "Really Love You" and "Mystic Lady" receiving airplay as well.

Track listing
All songs written and arranged by Ron West.
Side I
 Intro 1:06
 Movin' On 3:32
 Got That Fever 3:20
 I'm Still Tryin' 4:12
 You're Alright 3:02
 Really Love You 3:32

Side II
 Hold Me 3:05
 I Know It's Love 3:05
 Come On Move 2:52
 Goin' Home 2:25
 Mystic Lady 5:18

Personnel
Ron West - Lead Vocals, Rhythm Guitar, Keyboards, Harmonica
Lane Turner - Lead Guitar
Alan Cohen - Bass, Vocals
Bill Larson - Drums

Production
Produced by Ron West and Chris Fritz
Recorded and Engineered by John Mosely
Mixed by Paul Ratajczak
Mastered by Carol Hibbs
Production Assistant - Gary Hodgden
Jacket Design - Jeff Kirtley
Photography - Mark Lawhon

Review
 The band Missouri and their debut album, November 8, 2013

1977 debut albums
Missouri (band) albums